Tifosi (also known as Fans) is a 1999 Italian comedy film directed by Neri Parenti.

Plot 
The film consists of four segments. The Roman Cesare, a supporter of Lazio, hates to death the Interist Carlo, even if their children fall in love. Silvio, a supporter of Milan, finds himself involved in a match in the company of peasants fans of A.S. Roma. The hooligan "Zebrone", a supporter of  Juventus, faces three representatives of a rival football team, who intend to steal the scarf that Zebrone has received as a gift from a footballer. The thief Gennaro meets the legendary Diego Maradona in his villa in Naples during a match between Napoli and Atalanta.

Cast

References

External links

Italian sports comedy films
Italian association football films
Films directed by Neri Parenti
Films scored by Bruno Zambrini
1999 films
1990s sports comedy films
1990s Italian-language films
1990s Italian films